In Greek mythology, Pylaemenes (Ancient Greek: Πυλαιμένης) may refer to two distinct characters:

 Pylaemenes, king of the Eneti tribe of Paphlagonia. He claimed to be related to Priam through Phineus, as the latter's daughter Olizone was married to Dardanus. Pylaemenes led his Paphlagonian forces to the Trojan War, as a Trojan ally.  He was killed in battle by Menelaus of Sparta.  His son named Harpalion was killed by the Cretan warrior Meriones, son of Molus. Homer provided no parentage for Pylaemenes, but other mythographers named his father as Bilsates or Melius.
 Pylaemenes, one of the Suitors of Penelope who came from Dulichium along with other 56 wooers. He, with the other suitors, was shot dead by Odysseus with the help of Eumaeus, Philoetius, and Telemachus.

Notes

References 

 Apollodorus, The Library with an English Translation by Sir James George Frazer, F.B.A., F.R.S. in 2 Volumes, Cambridge, MA, Harvard University Press; London, William Heinemann Ltd. 1921. ISBN 0-674-99135-4. Online version at the Perseus Digital Library. Greek text available from the same website.
Dictys Cretensis, from The Trojan War. The Chronicles of Dictys of Crete and Dares the Phrygian translated by Richard McIlwaine Frazer, Jr. (1931-). Indiana University Press. 1966. Online version at the Topos Text Project.
Homer, The Iliad with an English Translation by A.T. Murray, Ph.D. in two volumes. Cambridge, MA., Harvard University Press; London, William Heinemann, Ltd. 1924. . Online version at the Perseus Digital Library.
Homer, Homeri Opera in five volumes. Oxford, Oxford University Press. 1920. . Greek text available at the Perseus Digital Library.
Livy - Book 1

Kings in Greek mythology
People of the Trojan War
Suitors of Penelope